Drigg is a village situated in the civil parish of Drigg and Carleton on the West Cumbria coast of the Irish Sea and on the boundary of the Lake District National Park in the Borough of Copeland in the county of Cumbria, England.

Drigg and Carleton parish comprises the areas and settlements of Drigg, Stubble Green, Low Moor, Carleton, Saltcoats, Maudsyke, Wray Head, Hallsenna, Holmrook. The civil parish population at the 2011 census was 449.

Drigg sits to the north of the River Irt, with Carleton to the south of the river. The river runs from Wastwater lake to the Irish Sea. There are three bridges over the river in the parish; the main bridge is in Holmrook which takes the A595 road over the river. The Cumbrian Coast Line railway crosses the River Irt at the head of the tidal estuary where the Irt joins the River Mite at Ravenglass. There is an old small packhorse bridge in the Drigg Holmes which does not take vehicles.

Drigg railway station is on the Cumbrian Coast Line.

The parish has a number of areas of natural interest: the sandy beach and dunes, Hallsenna Moor and Drigg Holmes. Part of the dunes are an important bird reserve, a local nature reserve and a Site of Special Scientific Interest.

On 2 June 2010, Carleton became one of the settlements involved in a killing spree spanning Cumbria, when 52-year-old Derrick Bird shot and killed a person in the village.

Governance
Drigg is within the Copeland UK Parliamentary constituency, Trudy Harrison is the Member of parliament.

Before Brexit, it was in the North West England European Parliamentary Constituency.

Low Level Waste Repository

During WW2 a Royal Ordnance Factory (ROF Drigg) was established at Drigg between the railway line and the sea. This is now the site of the Nuclear Decommissioning Authority low-level radioactive waste repository. Much of the waste came from the nearby Sellafield nuclear complex.

See also

Listed buildings in Drigg and Carleton

References

External links

Cumbria County History Trust: Drigg (nb: provisional research only – see Talk page)
Drigg Reserve LNR citation  

Villages in Cumbria
Borough of Copeland
Radioactive waste repositories

de:Drigg